is a modern Latin phrase meaning "condemnation of memory", indicating that a person is to be excluded from official accounts. Depending on the extent, it can be a case of historical negationism. The term can be applied to other instances of official scrubbing; in history the practice is seen as long ago as the aftermath of the reign of the Egyptian Pharaohs Akhenaten in the 14th century BC, and Hatshepsut in the 15th century BC.

Etymology 
Although the term  is Latin, the phrase was not used by the ancient Romans, and first appeared in a thesis written in Germany in 1689.

Ancient world 

Today's best known examples of damnatio memoriae from antiquity concern chiselling stone inscriptions or deliberately omitting certain information from them.

Ancient Mesopotamia 

According to Stefan Zawadzki, the oldest known examples of such practices come from around 2000–3000 BC. He cites the example of Lagash (an ancient city-state founded by the Sumerians in southern Mesopotamia), where preserved inscriptions concerning a conflict with another city-state, Umma, do not mention the ruler of Umma, but describe him as "the man of Umma", which Zawadzki sees as an example of deliberate degradation of the ruler of Umma to the role of an unworthy person whose name and position in history the rulers of Lagash did not want to record for posterity.

Ancient Egypt 
Egyptians also practiced this, as seen in relics from pharaoh Akhenaten’s tomb and elsewhere. Akhenaten’s sole worship of the god Aten, instead of the many gods prior to the time, was considered heretical. During his reign, Akhenaten endeavoured to have all references to the god Amun chipped away and removed. After his reign, temples to the Aten were dismantled and the stones reused to create other temples. Images of Akhenaten had their faces chipped away, and images and references to Amun reappeared. The people blamed their misfortunes on Akhenaten's shift of worship to Atenism, away from the gods they served before him. 

Another Egyptian victim of this practice was pharaoh Ay. The campaign of damnatio memoriae against Akhenaten and Ay was initiated by the latter's successor, Horemheb, who decided to erase from history all pharaohs associated with the unpopular Amarna Period; this process was continued by Horemheb's successors.

Ancient Greece 

The practice was known in Ancient Greece. The Athenians frequently destroyed inscriptions which referred to individuals or events that they no longer wished to commemorate. After Timotheus was convicted of treason and removed from his post as general in 373 BC, all references to him as a general were deleted from the previous year's naval catalogue. The most complete example is their systematic removal of all references to the Antigonids from inscriptions in their city, in 200 BC when they were besieged by the Antigonid king Philip V of Macedon during the Second Macedonian War. One decree praising Demetrius Poliorcetes (Philip V's great-grandfather) was smashed and thrown down a well. 

At Delphi, an honorific inscription erected between 337 and 327 BC for Aristotle and his nephew Callisthenes, two philosophers who were closely associated with the Macedonians, were smashed and thrown in a well after the death of Alexander of Macedon in 323 BC. 

After Herostratus set fire to the Temple of Artemis, one of the Seven Wonders of antiquity, the people of Ephesus banned the mention of his name.

Ancient Rome 

If the Senate or a later emperor did not like the acts of an emperor, they could have his property seized, his name erased and his statues reworked (normally defaced). Because there was an economic incentive to seize property and rework statues, historians and archaeologists have had difficulty determining when official  actually took place, although it seems to have been quite rare.

Compounding this difficulty is the fact that a completely successful  results—by definition—in the full and total erasure of the subject from the historical record. In the case of figures such as emperors or consuls it is unlikely that complete success was possible, as even comprehensive obliteration of the person's existence and actions in records and the like would continue to be historically visible without extensive reworking. The impracticality of such a cover-up could be vast—in the case of Emperor Geta, for example, coins bearing his effigy proved difficult to entirely remove from circulation for several years, even though the mere mention of his name was punishable by death.

Difficulties in implementation also arose if there was not full and enduring agreement with the punishment, such as when the Senate's condemnation of Nero was implemented—leading to attacks on many of his statues—but subsequently evaded with the enormous funeral he was given by Vitellius. Similarly, it was often difficult to prevent later historians from "resurrecting" the memory of the sanctioned person.

The impossibility of actually erasing memory of an emperor have led scholars to conclude that this was not actually the goal of damnatio. Instead, they understand damnatio:

Middle Ages 

In the Middle Ages, heresiarchs could have their memory condemned.

Modern usage

After Stalin ordered the murder of Grigory Kulik's wife Kira Kulik-Simonich, all images of the woman disappeared, and historians have no idea of what she looked like. Following their fall from favour, Lavrentiy Beria and others  were removed from articles in the Great Soviet Encyclopedia. Following the fall of communism in Eastern Europe, many communist statues, particularly of Lenin and Stalin, were removed from former Soviet satellite states. Following a 2015 decision, Ukraine successfully dismantled all 1,320 statues of Lenin after its independence, as well as renaming roads and structures named under Soviet authority.

The graphic designer David King had a strong interest in Soviet art and design, and amassed a collection of over 250,000 images.  His most striking examples of before-and-after alterations were published as The Commissar Vanishes.

Poland 
19th century Polish writers often omitted mentioning two kings from the list of Polish monarchs, Bezprym and Wenceslaus III of Bohemia, which has resulted in their being omitted from many later works as well.

China 

Germany 
The destruction of all copies of The Victory of Faith in order to erase Ernst Röhm is considered an act of National Socialist damnatio memoriae.  In the end, two copies survived: one preserved in London and one preserved by the Communist government of East Germany.

North Korea 
In December 2013, Jang Song-thaek was abruptly accused of being a counter-revolutionary and was stripped of all his posts and expelled from the Workers' Party of Korea (WPK). His photos were removed from official media and his image digitally removed from photos with other North Korean leaders.

Analysis
The term is used in modern scholarship to cover a wide array of official and unofficial sanctions through which the physical remnants and memories of a deceased individual are destroyed.

Nonetheless, Beiner goes on to argue that the purpose of —rather than being to erase people from history—was to guarantee only negative memories of those who were so dishonored. Pointing out that  did not erase people from history but in effect kept their memory alive, Beiner concluded that those who partake in the destruction of a monument should be considered agents of memory.

See also 

 Alan Smithee
 Anathema
 Cancel culture
 Censorship in Italy
 Censorship in North Korea
 Censorship of images in the Soviet Union
 Crisis of the Roman Republic
 Denazification/De-Ba'athification/Decommunization/De-Stalinization
 Historical negationism
 Historical revisionism
 Iconoclasm
 Execration texts
 Forced disappearance
 List of condemned Roman emperors
 List of tombs of antipopes
 Memory hole
 Nineteen Eighty-Four, Orwell's 1949 novel
 Nonperson
 Persona non grata
 Proscription
 Shunning
 Slighting
 Yimakh shemo

References

Bibliography

External links 

 Damnatio memoriae at Livius.org

 
Crime and punishment in ancient Rome
Historical negationism
Blacklisting
Latin words and phrases